Bruno Magras (born 9 September 1951) is a French politician. A member of the Union for a Popular Movement since 1995, since July 15, 2007 he has been President of the Federation of Saint-Barthélemy, winning with 72% of the vote. He was reelected on November 19, 2010 for another three years. He is ex officio member of the National Council of UMP1. Also a businessman, he is the founder and CEO of St Barth Commuter.

References

1951 births
Living people
Presidents of the Territorial Council of Saint Barthélemy
Members of the Territorial Council of Saint Barthélemy
Union for a Popular Movement politicians